The Stanley Mosk Courthouse is a courthouse in Los Angeles, California home to the Los Angeles County Superior Court. It is located at 110 N. Grand Avenue and 111 N. Hill Street between Temple and First streets, lining Grand Park in the Civic Center in Downtown Los Angeles. It has 100 courtrooms, 840 daily workers and 7000 daily visitors. The courthouse is often seen in the TV series Perry Mason, when the title character parks his car on Hill Street to go inside the building.

The architects were Stanton, Stockwell, Williams and Wilson, in Late Moderne style, which incorporates elements of both the Streamline Moderne and International style.  The team of architects designed the courthouse simultaneously with the Kenneth Hahn Hall of Administration (1960), both buildings conceived as part of the monumental 1947 Civic Center Master Plan. That plan also called for the extension of the Los Angeles Civic Center westward to incorporate the north end of the Bunker Hill area, which had been demolished, and created the east–west axis of civic buildings along what is today Grand Park. The courthouse was opened by Chief Justice Earl Warren in October 31, 1958. The courthouse was later named in honor of Stanley Mosk, the longest serving justice on the California Supreme Court and former Attorney General of California, in 2002.

Since 2019, the courthouse has gained prominence as the site of the conservatorship dispute of Britney Spears, and the corresponding #FreeBritney rallies which have taken place there.

References

Courthouses in California
Civic Center, Los Angeles
Late Moderne architecture
Stanton & Stockwell buildings
Government buildings completed in 1958